Timeslip may refer to:

 Time slip, plot device used in fiction in which a person can travel in time
 Time slip recording, a feature of some digital video recorders allowing earlier parts of a program to be viewed while later parts are being recorded
 Timeslip, in drag racing, a record of the vehicle's elapsed time, top speed, and the driver's reaction time

Popular culture
 Timeslip, a 1970-1 British science fiction television series
 Timeslip (1955 film), a science fiction film starring Gene Nelson and Faith Domergue
 Timeslip, a novel based on the 1966-7 television series The Time Tunnel
 "Timeslip", a 1979 short story by Colin Wilson
 Timeslip (comics), a Marvel Comics superhero
 In Kim Stanley Robinson's Mars Trilogy, 39.5 minutes after midnight during which clocks pause in the adjusted 24-hour Martian day
 Time Slip, a Super Nintendo Entertainment System video game
 G.I. Samurai (also known as Time Slip--Sengoku jieitai), a 1979 Japanese science fiction film starring Sonny Chiba
Time Slip (album), a 2019 studio album by Super Junior

See also
 Martian Time-Slip, a 1964 science fiction novel by Philip K. Dick